The 2015–16 Ole Miss Rebels women's basketball team represented University of Mississippi during the 2015–16 NCAA Division I women's basketball season. The Rebels are members of the Southeastern Conference (SEC) and were led by third-year head coach Matt Insell.The Rebels started the season playing their home games at Tad Smith Coliseum, but moved to the new Pavilion at Ole Miss on January 10, 2016. They finished the season 10–20, 2–14 in SEC play to finish in last place. They lost in the first round of the SEC women's tournament Vanderbilt.

Roster

Schedule

|-
!colspan=9 style="background:#; color:white;"| Exhibition

|-
!colspan=9 style="background:#; color:white;"| Non-conference regular season

|-
!colspan=9 style="background:#; color:white;"| SEC regular season

|-
!colspan=9 style="background:#; color:white;"| SEC Women's Tournament

See also
2015–16 Ole Miss Rebels men's basketball team

References

Ole Miss Rebels women's basketball seasons
Ole Miss
Ole Miss Rebels
Ole Miss Rebels